Myllocerus equinus, is a species of weevil found in Sri Lanka.

Description
This small beetle is about 7 mm in length. Body piceous brown or black with dull white scales. Elytra dull white in color with nine piceous black spots. In the median area of head, there are dense white scales. Rostrum slightly longer than head. Apical emargination is deep and acute. Apex very slightly dilated. Antennae with stout scape. Prothorax transverse, strongly constricted near base. Upper surface with sparse, oblong and moderately deep punctations. Elytra very deep, oblong and distinct. Elytra covered with dull white scales. Elytral vestiture with ovate scales in interval with wavy apex and very small pedicel. There are two types of scales in elytral strial margin: predominant scales are conical with opaque inner core and a ridge with pale white to yellow or green. Less predominant scales are also conical, but pale green in color with pink tinge and greenish inner area. Legs are piceous brown with dull white scales. Anterior femoral pairs are bidentate, whereas hid femora tridentate.

References 

Curculionidae
Insects of Sri Lanka
Beetles described in 1988